Željko Musa (born 8 January 1986) is a Croatian handball player for RK Zagreb and the Croatian national team.

Honours

Gorenje Velenje
Slovenian First League: 2011–12
Slovenian Super Cup: 2011, 2012

References

External links

Profile at Vive Targi Kielce official website

1986 births
Living people
Croats of Bosnia and Herzegovina
Croatian male handball players
Sportspeople from Mostar
Expatriate handball players in Poland
Croatian expatriate sportspeople in Bosnia and Herzegovina
Croatian expatriate sportspeople in Germany
Croatian expatriate sportspeople in Poland
Croatian expatriate sportspeople in Slovenia
RK Medveščak Zagreb players
Vive Kielce players
Handball-Bundesliga players